ixigo (pronounced "ik-si-go") is an Indian AI-based online travel portal, launched in 2007. Headquartered in Gurgaon, ixigo aggregates and compares real-time travel information, prices and availability for flights, trains, buses, and hotels, and allows ticket booking through its associate websites and apps.

History 
ixigo (Le Travenues Technology, Pvt. Ltd.) was started by Rajnish Kumar and Aloke Bajpai in June 2007, with the launch of their flights metasearch website. In 2008, it introduced a hotel search engine on its website.

In early 2014 ixigo launched its train ticket booking app.

In February 2021, ixigo acquired the train discovery and ticketing platform Confirmtkt in a cash and stock deal. In August 2021, ixigo acquired the bus ticket booking and fleet management portal AbhiBus in a cash and stock deal.

Funding
In August 2011, ixigo received $18.5 million investment from SAIF Partners and MakeMyTrip. In June 2015, smartphone maker Micromax Informatics invested an undisclosed amount in ixigo. In March 2017, ixigo closed a funding of $15 million in Series B round by venture capital firm Sequoia Capital India and Fosun RZ Capital. In July 2021, it raised 53 million in its pre-IPO round led by GIC with participation from investors including Orios Venture Partners, Trifecta Capital, Info Edge Ventures, among others.

References 

Travel ticket search engines
Indian travel websites
Micromax Mobile
Internet properties established in 2007
Indian companies established in 2007
Companies based in Gurgaon
2007 establishments in Haryana